Mary Lynette Wilson (22 March 1940) is an Australian former competitive figure skater. She represented Australia at the 1960 Winter Olympics.

Wilson and her 1960 Olympic teammate Aileen Shaw were coached in Melbourne by Nancy Burley, who had competed for Australia at the 1952 Winter Olympics.

At the Winter Olympics in Squaw Valley, California Wilson finished 26th (last) in both the compulsory figures and free skating components.

References 

1940 births
Living people
Figure skaters at the 1960 Winter Olympics
Australian female single skaters
Olympic figure skaters of Australia